Christian David (1692–1751) was a German Lutheran missionary, writer and hymnwriter. He travelled as a missionary of the Herrnhuter Brüdergemeine, the Moravian Church, to Greenland and to Native Americans. He is known as the author of hymn stanzas that were included in "Sonne der Gerechtigkeit" in 1932.

David was raised in the Catholic Church. He worked as a carpenter and a soldier. He was impressed by the pietist movement and converted in 1714. In 1722, he helped refugees from Moravia to escape the counter reformation to Saxony. There, he was a co-founder of the Herrnhuter Brüdergemeine, working closely with of Nikolaus Ludwig Graf von Zinzendorf. David went as a missionary of the Herrnhuter Brüdergemeine to Greenland and to Native Americans, among other places. On a mission to Greenland, he cofounded in 1733 the settlement Neu-Herrnhut, with Matthias Stach and Christian Stach.

David wrote a hymn "Seyd gegrüßt, zu tausendmahl" (Be welcome, a thousand times), published in 1728. Two centuries later, Otto Riethmüller chose two of its stanzas for the hymn "Sonne der Gerechtigkeit", published first in 1932 in a song book for young people, Ein neues Lied (A new song), and later in many hymnals. An additional stanza was added to the hymn in an ecumenical version in 1971.

References

Bibliography 

 
 
 
 
 
 

1692 births
1751 deaths
18th-century German writers
18th-century German male writers
German Protestant hymnwriters
German Lutheran missionaries
Converts to Lutheranism from Roman Catholicism
Moravian-German people
People from Nový Jičín District
Lutheran missionaries in Greenland
Moravian Church missionaries